Frederica Piedade (born 5 June 1982) is a former Portuguese tennis player.

Her career-high WTA singles ranking is No. 142, which she reached on 15 May 2006; her best doubles ranking is No. 158, achieved on 16 February 2009. Piedade has competed for he Portugal Fed Cup team, having a total win–loss record of 12–4.

Though not officially retired, she hasn't played in the professional circuit since 2009.
In the summer of 2014, Frederica toured the Portuguese communities on Long Island, New York as she prepared for the US Open.

ITF Circuit finals

Singles: 23 (11 titles, 12 runner-ups)

Doubles: 38 (19 titles, 19 runner-ups)

See also
Luso Ténis Profile (in Portuguese)

References

External links
 
 
 

1982 births
Living people
Portuguese female tennis players
People from Faro, Portugal
Sportspeople from Faro District
21st-century Portuguese women